Manuel "Manolo" Sánchez Ramírez (born 12 December 1969) is a Spanish retired footballer who played as a defender, and a current manager.

Club career
Born in Sabadell, Barcelona, Catalonia, Sánchez started his senior career with Peña Los Merengues FC after graduating from CE Mercantil's youth setup. In 1990 he moved to CE Sabadell FC, being initially assigned to the reserves in the regional leagues.

Sánchez made his first team debut on 14 April 1991, starting in a 1–1 Segunda División home draw against Sestao River. After four matches, he was definitely promoted to the main squad the following campaign.

Sánchez subsequently spent the remainder of his career in Segunda División B and Tercera División, representing UE Figueres, Real Murcia, Lorca CF, Ciudad de Murcia (with the half of the 2004–05 campaign in the second tier), Mazarrón CF and CP Villarrobledo. He retired with the latter in 2005, after contributing with two goals in 33 matches.

Manager career
Immediately after retiring, Sánchez started his managerial career with fourth tier club CD La Unión. On 5 December 2008 he was named Águilas CF manager in the third level, and managed to finish tenth in the season.

On 30 January 2010, Sánchez was appointed at the helm of Moratalla CF. On 14 December, after suffering team relegation, he was presented at Jumilla CF.

On 24 January 2011 Sánchez was relieved from his duties, and subsequently went on to work as Antonio Calderón's assistant at CD Tenerife. On 2 October of the following year he was appointed UCAM Murcia CF manager, but was sacked on 6 December.

References

External links

1969 births
Living people
Sportspeople from Sabadell
Spanish footballers
Footballers from Catalonia
Association football defenders
Segunda División players
Segunda División B players
Tercera División players
Recreativo de Huelva players
UE Figueres footballers
Real Murcia players
Ciudad de Murcia footballers
Spanish football managers
UCAM Murcia CF managers
CE Sabadell FC B players